The Walk of the Brave was laid in Kyiv on the initiative of President of Ukraine Volodymyr Zelenskyy for the 31st anniversary of Ukraine's independence. The place was not chosen by chance, because it was on the Constitution Square opposite the Verkhovna Rada.

The Walk features leaders and countries who have supported Ukraine during the 2022 Russian invasion of Ukraine.

History 

The Walk of the Brave was laid on Constitution Square near the Verkhovna Rada building in Kyiv to mark the 31st anniversary of Ukraine's independence.

The Walk features leaders and countries who have supported Ukriane during the 2022 Russian invasion of Ukraine.

The President of Poland Andrzej Duda was the first to be honored. He personally took part in the opening.

Foreign leaders who are honored on the Walk of the Brave 

All leaders of countries and opinion leaders who visited Ukraine from February 24 to August 24 will be immortalized on the Walk of the Brave, but only the following plaques were solemnly opened:

Poland 

The President of Poland Andrzej Duda was the first to be honored.

“Today I want to open the Walk of the Brave in the presence of President of Poland Andrzej Duda. His name will always be on this Walk. It is a symbol of bravery, a symbol of friendship, of support for Ukraine when it is really needed,” Volodymyr Zelenskyy stated.

United Kingdom 

On August 24, 2022, a plaque honoring Boris Johnson was unveiled.

“We are personally grateful to Boris Johnson for his leadership, grateful for all these months of support, grateful to the society of Great Britain for the great help that the great power - Great Britain - provided to us every day, constantly, during the full-scale invasion,” said the President of Ukraine.

“We will thank not only in words, but also historically. Therefore, the name of Prime Minister of Great Britain Boris Johnson will appear on this Walk of the Brave today,” he said.

Latvia 

On September 9, 2022, during a visit to Ukraine, the President of Latvia Egils Levits together with the President of Ukraine Volodymyr Zelenskyy opened a plaque with his name on the Walk of the Brave.

Czech Republic, Poland, and Slovenia 

On March 15 the Prime Minister of Poland Mateusz Morawiecki, the Prime Minister of Czech Republic Petr Fiala, and the Prime Minister of Slovenia Janez Jansa, as well as the Deputy Prime Minister of Poland for Security Affairs, the leader of the ruling Law and Justice party, Jarosław Kaczyński, were the first of all foreign leaders to visit Ukraine from the beginning of the 2022 Russian invasion of Ukraine.

On September 9, 2022 the Prime Minister of Poland, Mateusz Morawiecki, together with the President of Ukraine, Volodymyr Zelensky, opened a plaque on which the names of all 4 politicians were displayed.

United States
On February 21, 2023, the President of the United States, Joe Biden was honored with a plaque on the Walk of the Brave. Biden had made a surprise visit to Ukraine on the same day to show support for their fight against Russia.

European Union 

“In times of war, we gather on this square not by a coincidence, as here are the names of world leaders who supported our state, our people, our economy and during this war stood by our side against the aggression of the Russian Federation. I would like the name of the honorable President of the European Commission, Ursula von der Leyen, to appear on this Walk today,” Volodymyr Zelenskyy said during a ceremony unveiling a plaque in her honor.

See also 
Government and intergovernmental reactions to the 2022 Russian invasion of Ukraine
United24
Be Brave Like Ukraine

References

External links 

Official website

2022 establishments in Ukraine
Monuments and memorials in Kyiv
Pecherskyi District
2022 Russian invasion of Ukraine in popular culture